Karin Tekla Maria Lannby (13 April 1916, Linköping – 19 November 2007, Paris) was a Swedish actress, translator, journalist, poet and spy. She served as a spy for the leftists during the Spanish civil war, and for Sweden in Stockholm during World War II.

Biography
The daughter of journalist Gunnar Lannby and Lilly Lannby, the boss of the Swedish agency of the American film company Metro Goldwyn Mayer. Through her mother, Lilly, Karin belonged to the Stockholm high society. As a student in the 1930s, Karin, being a convinced anti-fascist, joined the Swedish Communists. During the Spanish civil-war, she served as an interpreter and secretary at a hospital in Valencia. She made contact with the Comintern in Barcelona, who gave her an assignment to infiltrate the troops of Francisco Franco in the south of France. After having failed her task, she was excluded from the communists and returned to Sweden. From 1939 to 1945, she was an agent in service of the Swedish state during the war; under the code name Annette, she reported of her observations from the cultural and diplomatic circles of Stockholm's party life.

She acted in several films during the war. In 1940–41, she had a relationship with Ingmar Bergman; she is said to have been the role model for the character Ruth Köhler in the film Kvinna utan ansikte (1947). After the war, Karin Lannby changed her name to Maria Cyliakus  and moved to France (1952), where she was active as an actress, translator and journalist.

See also
 Erika Wendt
 Jane Horney

References

Literature
 Anders Thunberg (in Swedish): Karin Lannby: Ingmar Bergmans Mata Hari (Karin Lannby: The Mata Hari of Ingmar Bergman) (2009)

1916 births
2007 deaths
People of the C-byrån
Female wartime spies
Swedish people of World War II
Swedish actresses
Swedish people of the Spanish Civil War
Swedish translators
Swedish poets
Women in war 1900–1945
Women in war in Spain
Women in World War II
20th-century translators
20th-century Swedish women writers
20th-century Swedish poets
World War II spies for Sweden
20th-century Swedish journalists